The Kosovo curse ( / Kosovska kletva) or Prince's curse ( / Kneževa kletva), is according to legend, a curse said by Serbian Prince Lazar before the Battle of Kosovo. Lazar curses those Serbs who ignored his call for war against the Ottoman Empire. Constantine of Kostenets recorded that Lazar issued "invitation and threat" to Serbian states which is preserved in the Serbian epic poetry in the form of the curse. 

From 1778 to 1781, Avram Miletić composed a miscellany of 129 songs which also included the song "A history of Musić Stefan" containing a form of the Kosovo curse. One form of the curse appeared in the 1845 edition of the collection of Serbian folk songs by Vuk Karadžić. It is an updated version of an 1813 text by Karadžić with stronger nationalist overtones.

Karadžić's "Kosovo curse" is inscribed on the Gazimestan monument, where the Battle of Kosovo was fought.

Text of the curse

See also 
 Miloš Obilić
 Onamo, 'namo!
 Serbian epic poetry

References

History of Kosovo
Curses
Serbian inscriptions
Serbian nationalism in Kosovo